The economic history of the Republic of Turkey may be studied according to sub-periods signified with major changes in economic policy: 

 1923–1929, when development policy emphasised private accumulation; 
 1929–1945, when development policy emphasised state accumulation in a period of global crises; 
 1950–1980, a period of state guided industrialisation based on import substituting protectionism;
 1980 onwards, opening of the Turkish economy to liberal trade in goods, services and financial market transactions. 

However one distinct characteristic between 1923–1985, in large part as a result of government policies, a backward economy developed into a complex economic system producing a wide range of agricultural, industrial, and service products for both domestic and export markets the economy grew at an average annual rate of six percent.

Since 1820, Turkey has experienced economic growth and human development at average levels (compared to the rest of the world) but at higher rates than other developing countries.

From World War I to World War II 

At the time of the collapse of the Ottoman Empire (see Economy of the Ottoman Empire) during World War I and the subsequent birth of the Republic, the Turkish economy was underdeveloped: agriculture depended on outmoded techniques and poor-quality livestock, and Turkey's industrial base was weak; the few factories producing basic products such as sugar and flour were under foreign control as a result of the capitulations.

Turkey's economy recovered remarkably once hostilities ceased. From 1923 to 1926, agricultural output rose by eighty-seven percent, as agricultural production returned to pre-war levels. Industry and services grew at more than nine percent per year from 1923 to 1929; however, their share of the economy remained quite low at the end of the decade. The government stepped in during the early 1930s to promote economic recovery, following a doctrine known as statism. Growth slowed during the worst years of the depression, except between 1935 and 1939 when it reached six percent per year. During the 1940s, the economy stagnated, in large part because maintaining armed neutrality during World War II increased the country's military expenditures while almost entirely curtailing foreign trade.

Post 1950 
After 1950 the country suffered economic disruptions about once a decade; the most serious crisis occurred in the late 1970s. In each case, an industry-led period of rapid expansion, marked by a sharp increase in imports, resulted in a balance of payments crisis. Devaluations of the Turkish lira and austerity programs designed to dampen domestic demand for foreign goods were implemented in accordance with International Monetary Fund guidelines. These measures usually led to sufficient improvement in the country's external accounts to make possible the resumption of loans to Turkey by foreign creditors. Although the military interventions of 1960 and 1971 were prompted in part by economic difficulties, after each intervention Turkish politicians boosted government spending, causing the economy to overheat. In the absence of serious structural reforms, Turkey ran chronic current account deficits usually financed by external borrowing that made the country's external debt rise from decade to decade, reaching by 1980 about US$16.2 billion, or more than one-quarter of annual gross domestic product. Debt-servicing costs in that year equaled 33 percent of exports of goods and services.

By the late 1970s, Turkey's economy had perhaps reached its worst crisis since the fall of the Ottoman Empire. Turkish authorities had failed to take sufficient measures to adjust to the effects of the sharp increase in world oil prices in 1973–74 and had financed the resulting deficits with short-term loans from foreign lenders. By 1979 inflation had reached triple-digit levels, unemployment had risen to about 15 percent, the industry was using only half its capacity, and the government was unable to pay even the interest on foreign loans. It seemed that Turkey would be able to sustain crisis-free development only if major changes were made in the government's import-substitution approach to development. Many observers doubted the ability of Turkish politicians to carry out the needed reforms.

Reforms under Özal 
In January 1980, the government of Prime Minister Süleyman Demirel (who had served as prime minister 1965–71, 1975–78, and 1979–80) began implementing a far-reaching reform program designed by then Undersecretary of the Prime Ministry Turgut Özal to shift Turkey's economy toward export-led growth.

The Özal strategy called for import-substitution policies to be replaced with policies designed to encourage exports that could finance imports, giving Turkey a chance to break out of the postwar pattern of alternating periods of rapid growth and deflation. With this strategy, planners hoped Turkey could experience export-led growth over the long run. The government pursued these goals by means of a comprehensive package: devaluation of the Turkish lira and institution of flexible exchange rates, maintenance of positive real interest rates and tight control of the money supply and credit, elimination of most subsidies and the freeing of prices charged by state enterprises, reform of the tax system, and encouragement of foreign investment. In July 1982, when Özal left office, many of his reforms were placed on hold. Starting in November 1983, however, when he again became prime minister, he was able to extend the liberalization program.

The liberalization program overcame the balance of payments crisis, reestablished Turkey's ability to borrow in international capital markets, and led to renewed economic growth. Merchandise exports grew from US$2.3 billion in 1979 to US$8.3 billion in 1985. Merchandise import growth in the same periodfrom US$4.8 billion to US$11.2 billiondid not keep pace with export growth and proportionately narrowed the trade deficit, although the deficit level stabilized at around US$2.5 billion. Özal's policies had a particularly positive impact on the services account of the current account. Despite a jump in interest payments, from US$200 million in 1979 to US$1.4 billion in 1985, the services account accumulated a growing surplus during this period. Expanding tourist receipts and pipeline fees from Iraq were the main reasons for this improvement. Stabilizing the current account helped restore creditworthiness on international capital markets. Foreign investment, which had been negligible in the 1970s, now started to grow, although it remained modest in the mid-1980s. Also, Turkey was able to borrow on the international market, whereas in the late 1970s it could only seek assistance from the IMF and other official creditors.

The reduction in public expenditures, which was at the heart of the stabilization program, slowed the economy sharply in the late 1970s and early 1980s. Real gross national product declined 1.5 percent in 1979 and 1.3 percent in 1980. The manufacturing and services sectors felt much of the impact of this drop in income, with the manufacturing sector operating at close to 50 percent of total capacity. As the external-payments constraint eased, the economy bounced back sharply. Between 1981 and 1985, real GNP grew 3 percent per year, led by growth in the manufacturing sector. With tight controls on workers' earnings and activities, the industrial sector began drawing on unused industrial capacity and raised output by an average rate of 9.1 percent per year between 1981 and 1985. The devaluation of the lira also helped make Turkey more economically competitive. As a result, exports of manufactures increased by an average rate of 4.5 percent per annum during this period.

The rapid resurgence of growth and the improvement in the balance of payments were insufficient to overcome unemployment and inflation, which remained serious problems. The official jobless rate fell from 15 percent in 1979 to 11 percent in 1980, but, partly because of the rapid growth of the labor force, unemployment rose again, to 13 percent in 1985. Inflation fell to about 25 percent in the 1981–82 period, but it climbed again, to more than 30 percent in 1983 and more than 40 percent in 1984. Although inflation eased somewhat in 1985 and 1986, it remained one of the primary problems facing economic policy makers.

Economic performance in the early 1990s 
With limited access to the Persian Gulf, Iraq also came to depend heavily on Turkey for export routes for its crude oil. Iraq had financed two pipelines located next to one another from its northern Kirkuk oilfields to the Turkish Mediterranean port of Yumurtalık, slightly northwest of İskenderun. Not only did Turkey obtain part of its domestic supplies from the pipeline, but it was paid a sizable entrepôt fee. Some sources have estimated this fee at US$300 million to US$500 million.

Turkey's economy was battered by the 1991 Persian Gulf War. The UN embargo on Iraq required the ending of oil exports through the Kirkuk-Yumurtalık pipelines, resulting in the loss of the pipeline fees. In addition, the economy may have lost as much as US$3 billion in trade with Iraq. Saudi Arabia, Kuwait, and the United Arab Emirates (UAE) moved to compensate Turkey for these losses, however, and by 1992 the economy again began to grow rapidly.

Turkey's impressive economic performance in the 1980s won high marks from Wall Street's credit-rating agencies. In 1992 and 1993, the government used these ratings to attract funds to cover its budget deficits. International bond issues over this period amounted to US$7.5 billion. These capital flows helped maintain the overvalued exchange rate. In a market economy, a high level of government borrowing should translate into higher domestic interest rates and even possibly "crowd out" private-sector borrowers, thereby eventually slowing economic growth. But the government's foreign borrowing took the pressure off domestic interest rates and actually spurred more private-sector borrowing in an already overheated economy. Sensing an easy profit opportunity during this period, commercial banks borrowed at world interest rates and lent at Turkey's higher domestic rates without fear of a depreciating currency. As a result, Turkey's foreign short-term debt rose sharply. External and internal confidence in the government's ability to manage the impending balance of payments crisis waned, compounding economic difficulties.

Disputes between Prime Minister Tansu Çiller (1993–1996) and the Central Bank governor undermined confidence in the government. The prime minister insisted on monetizing the fiscal deficit (selling government debt instruments to the Central Bank) rather than acceding to the Central Bank's proposal to issue more public debt in the form of government securities. The Central Bank governor resigned in August 1993 over this issue. In January 1994, international credit agencies downgraded Turkey's debt to below investment grade. At that time, a second Central Bank governor resigned.

Mounting concern over the disarray in economic policy was reflected in an accelerated "dollarization" of the economy as residents switched domestic assets into foreign-currency deposits to protect their investments. By the end of 1994, about 50 percent of the total deposit base was held in the form of foreign-currency deposits, up from 1 percent in 1993. The downgrading by credit-rating agencies and a lack of confidence in the government's budget deficit target of 14 percent of GDP for 1994 triggered large-scale capital flight and the collapse of the exchange rate. The government had to intervene by selling its foreign-currency reserves to staunch the decline of the Turkish lira. As a result, reserves fell from US$6.3 billion at the end of 1993 to US$3 billion by the end of March 1994. Before the end of April, when the government was forced to announce a long-overdue austerity program following the March 1994 local elections, the lira had plummeted by 76 percent from the end of 1993 to TL41,000 against the United States dollar.

The package of measures announced by the government on April 5, 1994, was also submitted to the IMF as part of its request for a US$740 million standby facility beginning in July 1994. Measures included a sharp increase in prices the public-sector enterprises would charge the public, decreases in budgetary expenditures, a commitment to raise taxes, and a pledge to accelerate privatization of state economic enterprises (SEEs). Some observers questioned the credibility of these measures, given that the tax measures translated into a revenue increase equivalent to 4 percent of GDP and the expenditure cuts were equivalent to 6 percent of GDP.

The government actually succeeded in generating a small surplus in the budget during the second quarter of 1994, mainly as a result of higher taxes, after running a deficit of 17 percent of GDP in the first quarter. The slowdown in government spending, a sharp loss in business confidence, and the resulting decline in economic activity reduced tax revenues, however. The fiscal crisis resulted in a decline in real GDP of 5 percent in 1994 after the economy had grown briskly in 1992 and 1993. Real wages also fell in 1994: average nominal wage increases of 65 percent were about 20 percent below the rate of consumer price inflation.

Analysts pointed out that despite the fragility of the macroeconomic adjustment process and the susceptibility of fiscal policy to political pressures, the government continued to be subject to market checks and balances. Combined with a stronger private sector, particularly on the export front, the economy was expected to bounce back to a pattern of faster growth.

A comprehensive research in Journal of Developing Economies which was authored by Mete Feridun of University of Greenwich Business School, report statistical evidence that currency crises in Turkey during this period are associated with global liquidity conditions, fiscal imbalances, capital outflows, and banking sector weaknesses 

A more recent research by Mete Feridun which was published in Emerging Markets Finance and Trade investigates the hypothesis that there is a causal relation between speculative pressure and real exchange rate overvaluation, banking-sector fragility, and the level of international reserves in Turkey shedding more light on Turkey's economic history of 1990s.

See also 
 Economy of Turkey

References